SNOW 1.0, SNOW 2.0, and SNOW 3G are word-based synchronous stream ciphers developed by Thomas Johansson and Patrik Ekdahl at Lund University.

History
SNOW 1.0, originally simply SNOW, was submitted to the NESSIE project. The cipher has no known intellectual property or other restrictions. The cipher works on 32-bit words and supports both 128- and 256-bit keys. The cipher consists of a combination of a LFSR and a Finite State Machine (FSM) where the LFSR also feeds the next state function of the FSM. The cipher has a short initialization phase and very good performance on both 32-bit processors and in hardware.

During the evaluation, weaknesses were discovered and as a result, SNOW was not included in the NESSIE suite of algorithms. The authors have developed a new version, version 2.0 of the cipher, that solves the weaknesses and improves the performance.

During ETSI SAGE evaluation, the design was further modified to increase its resistance against algebraic attacks with the result named SNOW 3G.

It has been found that related keys exist both for SNOW 2.0 and SNOW 3G, allowing attacks against SNOW 2.0 in the related-key model.

Use
SNOW has been used in the ESTREAM project as a reference cipher for the performance evaluation.

SNOW 2.0 is one out of stream ciphers chosen for ISO/IEC standard ISO/IEC 18033-4.

SNOW 3G is chosen as the stream cipher for the 3GPP encryption algorithms UEA2 and UIA2.

Sources

External links
 The Lund Crypto and Security group website

Stream ciphers